Cleft Ledge is a flat-topped ridge  long and  wide between Shaw Trough and Healy Trough in the Labyrinth of Wright Valley, McMurdo Dry Valleys. The name is descriptive and was recommended by the Advisory Committee on Antarctic Names (2004) because a central north-south hanging valley nearly divides the ledge in half.

References 

Ridges of Victoria Land
McMurdo Dry Valleys